Spanish guitar may refer to:
 Classical guitar, a six-stringed guitar with nylon strings 
 Name often given in the 20's and 30's to archtop guitars
 Flamenco guitar, similar to a classical guitar but commonly found in Spain and Latin America
 "Spanish Guitar" (song), a 2000 song by Toni Braxton
 "Spanish Guitar", a 1971 song by Gene Clark from his album White Light
 "Spanish Guitar", a 1978 song by Gary Moore from his album Back on the Streets
 Duets with Spanish Guitar, a 1958 album by Laurindo Almeida with Salli Terri and Martin Ruderman